Forget Kathmandu: An Elegy for Democracy is a historical book by Manjushree Thapa. The book was published in 2005 by Penguin Books. It is the third book of the writer who had previously published Mustang Bhot in Fragments in 1992 and The Tutor of History in 2001. Thapa is one of the first mainstream English writers from Nepal.

Synopsis 
The book covers several issues in the political and historical scenarios of Nepal. The book covers the ten year long Nepalese civil war and the Royal massacre. Thapa worked as a journalist during the Maoist insurgency in Nepal. The book records her experience, reportage and analysis of the various events that occurred in the last 10 years.

Reception 
Th book received positive responses from the critics and is Thapa's one the most popular work. Sam Miler called the book as "intelligent and challenging and deserves to be widely read" in his review for India Today magazine. Elvira Gardner praised the style of Thapa as "innovative" in their review for the journal European Bullet for Himalayan Research.

Translations 
The Italian translation of the book was published as Forget Kathmandu in 2006 translated by Gioia Guerzoni. The book was translated into Finnish as Unohda Kathmandu in 2008 by Erkki and Leena Vihtosella.

See also 

 Arresting God in Kathmandu
 The Tutor of History
 Palpasa Café

References 

21st-century Nepalese books
English books by Nepalese writer
Nepalese non-fiction books
Nepalese non-fiction literature
2005 non-fiction books
Nepalese literature in English
Works about the Nepalese Civil War